Greenwave is a mass science experiment involving primary schools across Ireland. It examines and records how spring arrives in Ireland. This is an educational and science initiative of the Irish Government’s Discover Science & Engineering (DSE) awareness programme.

Irish students observe and record when certain plants and animals react to the longer days and warmer temperatures, in order to find out whether the "green wave" of spring moves from south to north across Ireland or inland from the coast to the centre of the country.

Taking part in Greenwave is a practical way to support the teaching of Social Environmental and Scientific Education (SESE) part of the Irish Primary School Curriculum. The students develop their skills in:
Observing
Classifying
Recognising patterns
Estimating and measuring
Recording and communicating

Schools registered in the Discover Primary Science programme, another initiative of DSE, can also earn credit towards their Award of Science Excellence by taking part in Greenwave.

DSE runs numerous other initiatives, including Science Week Ireland, Discover Primary Science and Science.ie.

References

External links
 Greenwave website
 Information about Greenwave on Discover-Science.ie

Science education in Ireland
Science and technology in the Republic of Ireland
Environmental education